New Manchester may refer to:

New Manchester, a community in England
New Manchester, West Virginia, a community in the United States
New Manchester, a former community in the U.S. state of Georgia that is now part of Sweetwater Creek State Park